Neomachlotica is a genus of sedge moths. It was described by John B. Heppner in 1981.

Species
 Neomachlotica actinota
 Neomachlotica atractias Meyrick, 1909 (from Bolivia)
 Neomachlotica nebras
 Neomachlotica spiraea

References

External links
 Neomachlotica at Global Species

Glyphipterigidae